Catapausa is a genus of longhorn beetles of the subfamily Lamiinae,

Species 
It containing the following species:

 Catapausa albaria Heller, 1926
 Catapausa basimaculata Breuning, 1940
 Catapausa bimaculipennis Breuning, 1956
 Catapausa bispinosa Aurivillius, 1908
 Catapausa inermis Aurivillius, 1920
 Catapausa sulcatipennis Breuning, 1950

References

Homonoeini